Juza may refer to:
 Juza, Iran, a village in North Khorasan Province, Iran
 48171 Juza, an asteroid

People with the surname
 Martin Jůza (born 1987), Czech Magic: The Gathering player